Pendleton is an inner-city suburb and district of Salford, Greater Manchester, England. The A6 dual carriageway skirts the east of the district. Historically in Lancashire, Pendleton experienced rapid urbanisation during the Industrial Revolution.

History

The township has been variously recorded as Penelton in 1199, Pennelton in 1212, Penilton in 1236, Penhulton in 1331, Penulton in 1356 and Pendleton from about 1600.

In the Middle Ages the manor was held by the Hultons of Hulton Park.

Until 1780, Pendleton was rural, a group of cottages around a village green with a maypole. The Industrial Revolution brought about rapid expansion in the population and large cotton mills and premises for dyeing, printing, and bleaching were built providing employment. Pendleton Colliery was developed from the early 19th century.

Violence and looting occurred in Pendleton during the 2011 riots. In 2012, Salford City Council announced a £430million regeneration scheme for the area.

Governance
Pendleton emerged as a township and chapelry in the ecclesiastical parish of Eccles in the hundred of Salford in the historic county of Lancashire. After 1837 Pendleton was part of the Salford Poor Law Union which took responsibility for the administration of the Poor Law and provided a workhouse.

In 1844 the neighbouring township of Salford was incorporated as a borough. However owing to opposition from Pendleton rate payers who felt that their interests would be over-ruled by Salford, it was not until 1853 that Pendleton and neighbouring Broughton who had also refused to merge with Salford became incorporated into an enlarged Borough of Salford. This was owing to increasing concerns to improve the sanitary conditions of the two townships which would have otherwise resulted in the creation of Local Boards of Health. Pendleton together with Broughton thus became part of the County Borough of Salford from its inception in 1889, thus for the purposes of local government being independent from the jurisdictions of the newly formed Lancashire County Council. Pendleton became part of the City and County Borough of Salford in 1926 and in 1974 became part of the much enlarged metropolitan borough of the City of Salford, in the metropolitan county of Greater Manchester.

Pendleton is mostly covered by the electoral ward of Langworthy. It is represented in Westminster by Rebecca Long-Bailey MP for Salford and Eccles.

The ward is represented on Salford City Council by three Labour councillors: John Warmisham, Michele Barnes, and Wilson Nkurunziza.

Geography
Pendleton is 2 miles north west of Manchester city centre and separated by the River Irwell and at the junction of roads to Liverpool, Preston, Bolton and Manchester. The Manchester, Bolton & Bury Canal passes the area. Pendleton is on the Manchester Coalfield, part of Lancashire Coalfield.

The area gives its name to the geological feature known as the Pendleton Fault, one of four large faults running under the Manchester area. The faults are geologically active, and cause earthquake tremors that have been recorded for centuries, most recently in August 2007, when Manchester experienced six minor earthquakes.

Clarendon Park is within the bounds of Pendleton. The largest public park is Buile Hill Park which lies on high ground adjacent to Eccles Old Road.

Transport

Pendleton railway station closed in 1998 after it was damaged in an arson attack. Salford Crescent railway station links the district and with the stations in Manchester at (Piccadilly, Oxford Road and Victoria).

Parish church
St Thomas Church, a Commissioners' Church, is the parish church. It replaced the original chapel. It was built in 1829–31 to the design of Francis Goodwin and Richard Lane in a Perpendicular gothic revival style with a west tower and three galleries.

Notable people

The 19th century industrialist and Liberal politician Sir Elkanah Armitage lived at Hope Hall from 1853 until his death in 1876. The cartographer, printer and publisher George Bradshaw was born in 1801 and James Agate the theatre critic was also born here.

Tommy White (1908 – 1967), an Everton and England footballer, was born in Pendleton. Pat Kirkwood, who became one a stars of musical theatre, was born in Pendleton, and the actors Albert Finney, born in the Charlestown area and baptised at St George's Church, Charlestown, and Christopher Eccleston was brought up in Langworthy.

See also

Listed buildings in Salford, Greater Manchester
List of mining disasters in Lancashire

References
Notes

Bibliography

Areas of Salford